Kateryna Krasova is a road cyclist from Ukraine. She represented her nation at the 2005, 2006 and 2007 UCI Road World Championships.

References

External links
 profile at Procyclingstats.com

Ukrainian female cyclists
Living people
Place of birth missing (living people)
Year of birth missing (living people)